Civil Croatia was a designation for the areas of Central Croatia that were not part of the Habsburg Military Frontier. It was formed as part of the French-dominated Illyrian Provinces and disestablished in 1822 when it was given to the Kingdom of Croatia.

See also
 Croatian Military Frontier

Sources
 

Geographic history of Croatia
19th-century disestablishments in Austria-Hungary